The Progressive Senate Group is a parliamentary group in the Senate of Canada. It was formed on November 14, 2019, out of the now-defunct Senate Liberal Caucus, which had been expected to lose official party status in January 2020, when Senator Joseph Day was due to leave the Senate due to mandatory 
retirement. The caucus lost official status on November 18, 2019, when Percy Downe switched to the Canadian Senators Group, but regained it in May 2020 after several senators joined the caucus.

History
Facing extinction, on November 14, 2019, Senator Joseph Day announced during a press conference that the Senate Liberal Caucus had been officially disbanded, with its current complement of nine members forming a brand new, non-partisan parliamentary group in the Progressive Senate Group, with the hope that the new group would be able to attract additional Senators. Unlike the Independent Senators Group (ISG) and newly formed Canadian Senators Group, which impose either prohibitions or limits, respectively, on outside partisan activities, there was no mention that the new Progressive Senate Group would have similar limits; however, Day confirmed that, like the aforementioned two groups, the PSG would not have whipped votes, and the requirements of membership included supporting or holding "progressive" political values, support of the Canadian Charter of Rights and Freedoms, and supporting a new relationship with Indigenous peoples in Canada. With this dissolution, as of November 14, 2019, the Canadian Senate no longer had a Liberal Senator for the first time since Canada's confederation in 1867. Senator Terry Mercer, previously the Senate Liberal Caucus chair, was confirmed as the PSG's deputy leader. Senator Percy Downe was named as interim whip/facilitator of the PSG.

On November 18, Downe left to join the Canadian Senators Group. As Downe's departure dropped the PSG's standings below the minimum 9 members required to be recognized as a caucus, the PSG lost its official status and became ineligible for the privileges associated with being an official parliamentary group, such as $410,000 in annual funding for staff and research as well as its right to be represented on Senate committees and procedural rights on the Senate floor. Despite the loss of official recognition, interim PSG leader Joseph Day said that the group would not disband, and that it hoped to recruit additional members.

With Senator Day's mandatory retirement forthcoming in January 2020, on December 12, 2019, Jane Cordy tweeted that her colleagues in the PSG had selected her as the new leader, ostensibly effective that same date. Additionally, it was announced later that day that Terry Mercer would be moving into the whip/caucus chair role, and that  would become Deputy Leader.

On May 8, 2020, Patricia Bovey joined the caucus. Bovey, a Trudeau appointee and former member of the ISG, was the first member of the PSG to not be a former Liberal senator. A week later, on May 14, former Representative of the Government in the Senate Peter Harder joined the caucus. Harder, previously non-affiliated, explained that he was concerned about "majoritarianism" in the Senate and believed that, as part of the PSG, he could be "part of a bulwark against that." On May 21, 2020, Pierre Dalphond joined the caucus, bringing their numbers to nine and thus restoring official party status to the group.

On June 11, 2020, Bovey was named the PSG's liaison.

Leadership 

 Jane Cordy - Leader (December 12, 2019 – present)
 Pierre Dalphond - Deputy Leader (June 1, 2021 – present)
 Wanda Thomas Bernard - Liaison (June 11, 2020 – present)
 Brian Francis - Caucus Chair (December 1, 2020 – present)

Former leadership positions 

 Percy Downe - Whip/Facilitator (interim) (November 14, 2019 – November 17, 2019)
 Joseph Day - Leader (interim) (November 14, 2019 – December 11, 2019)
 Terry Mercer - Deputy Leader (interim) (November 12 – December 11, 2019); Caucus Chair (December 12, 2019 – November 30, 2020)
Dennis Dawson - Deputy Leader (December 12, 2019 – May 31, 2021)
Patricia Bovey - Liaison (June 11, 2020 – January 31, 2023)

Membership

Former members

See also 
Canadian Senators Group
Independent Senators Group
Senate Liberal Caucus

Notes

References

External links 
 

 
Senate of Canada
Independent politicians in Canada
2019 establishments in Canada
Political organizations established in 2019